Laguna Vista is a town in Cameron County, Texas, United States. The population was 3,117 at the 2010 census. It is included as part of the Brownsville–Harlingen–Raymondville and the Matamoros–Brownsville metropolitan areas.

Geography

Laguna Vista is located at  (26.103381, –97.296053).

Demographics

2020 census

As of the 2020 United States census, there were 3,520 people, 1,367 households, and 965 families residing in the town.

2000 census
At the 2000 census there were 1,658 people, 579 households, and 471 families in the town. The population density was 760.1 people per square mile (293.7/km). There were 695 housing units at an average density of 318.6 per square mile (123.1/km).  The racial makeup of the town was 84.08% White, 0.30% African American, 0.30% Native American, 0.60% Asian, 12.12% from other races, and 2.59% from two or more races. Hispanic or Latino of any race were 49.22%.

Of the 579 households 44.6% had children under the age of 18 living with them, 66.1% were married couples living together, 12.4% had a female householder with no husband present, and 18.5% were non-families. 16.8% of households were one person and 5.9% were one person aged 65 or older. The average household size was 2.86 and the average family size was 3.22.

The age distribution was 30.6% under the age of 18, 8.1% from 18 to 24, 27.9% from 25 to 44, 24.4% from 45 to 64, and 9.0% 65 or older. The median age was 33 years. For every 100 females, there were 89.7 males. For every 100 females age 18 and over, there were 84.5 males.

The median income for a household in the town was $43,641, and the median family income  was $48,304. Males had a median income of $35,625 versus $28,403 for females. The per capita income for the town was $19,924. About 9.3% of families and 10.8% of the population were below the poverty line, including 15.6% of those under age 18 and 4.1% of those age 65 or over.

Education 

Children living in Laguna Vista are zoned to schools in Point Isabel Independent School District. Children go to Derry Elementary School, (PK–5), Port Isabel Junior High School (6–8), and Port Isabel High School (9–12). All of the schools are in Port Isabel.

In addition, South Texas Independent School District operates magnet schools that serve Laguna Vista and many surrounding communities.

References

Towns in Cameron County, Texas
Towns in Texas
Populated coastal places in Texas